This is a list of ambassadors of the United States to Lithuania.

The United States first established diplomatic relations with the Baltic states (Lithuania, Latvia, Estonia) in 1922. One ambassador, resident in Riga, Latvia, was appointed to all three nations. Relations with the three nations were broken after the Soviet invasion of the republics in 1940 at the beginning of World War II. The United States never recognized the legitimacy of the Soviet occupation of the Baltic states, nor the legitimacy of the governments of those states under Soviet occupation. Hence, diplomatic relations were not resumed until 1992 after the collapse of the Soviet Union.

The U.S. Embassy in Lithuania is located in Vilnius.

Ambassadors

Notes

See also
Lithuania – United States relations
Foreign relations of Lithuania
Ambassadors of the United States

References
United States Department of State: Background notes on Lithuania

External links
United States Department of State: Chiefs of Mission for Lithuania
United States Department of State: Lithuania
United States Embassy in Vilnius

Lithuania

United States